Edwards Spur is a spur with a small rock exposure along its crest, located on the lower northwest slopes of Mount Moulton in Marie Byrd Land. It was mapped by the United States Geological Survey from surveys and from U.S. Navy air photos, 1959–65, and was named by the Advisory Committee on Antarctic Names for Alvah G. Edwards, a U.S. Navy Construction Driver with the Army–Navy Trail Party that traversed eastward from Little America V to establish Byrd Station in 1956.

References 

Ridges of Marie Byrd Land
Flood Range